Michael Bond (1926–2017) was an English author.

Michael Bond may also refer to:
 Michael Bond (hurler) (born 1948), retired Ireland hurling manager and former player
 Michael Bond (physician) (born 1936), British physician and medical researcher
 Michael Bond (American politician), Democratic member of the Illinois Senate
Michael Bond (South African politician), South African MP
 Michael Bond (rugby union) (born 1987), Australian rugby union player
 Mike Bond, American novelist and journalist